St Oliver Plunkett/Eoghan Ruadh (Irish: Naomh Oilibhéar Pluincéad, Eoghan Ruadh ) is a Gaelic Athletic Association club situated on the Navan Road on the northside of Dublin, Ireland. St Oliver Plunkett Eoghan Ruadh senior football team are sponsored by Dublin Bus. Plunketts won the 2006 Dublin AFL Division 2 title and won the 2007 Dublin AFL Division 1 title. Plunketts currently compete in the Dublin Senior Hurling League Division 2 and Dublin Senior B, Division 2 Camogie League.

History

Achievements
 Dublin Senior Football Championship: Runners-up: (3)
 2008, 2011, 2014
 Dublin Senior 2 Football Championship: Winners
 2013, 2016
 Dublin Senior Hurling Championship: Winners
 1951 (as Eoghan Ruadh)
 Dublin Senior B Hurling Championship: Winners
 2015
 Dublin Intermediate Hurling Championship: Winners (3)
 1955 (as Eoghan Ruadh), 1978 (as St. Oliver Plunkett's), 1985 (as St. Oliver Plunkett's)
 Dublin Junior Football Championship: Winners (1)
 2017
 Dublin Junior Hurling Championship: Winners (5)
 1929 (as Eoghan Ruadh), 1934 (as Eoghan Ruadh), 1942  (as Eoghan Ruadh), 1946  (as Eoghan Ruadh), 2001 (as St. Oliver Plunkett's)
 Dublin Junior C Football Championship Winner
 2009
 Dublin Junior B Hurling Championship Winners
 2014
 Dublin Junior C Hurling Championship Winners
 2013
 Dublin Junior D Hurling Championship Winners
 2011
 Dublin Junior F Hurling Championship Winners
 2012
 Dublin AFL Division 1: Winners (1)
 2007
 Dublin AFL Division 2: Winners (1)
 2006
 Dublin AFL Div. 7 Winners
 2014
 Dublin AFL Div. 9 Winners 
 2017
 Dublin Minor B Football Championship Winners
 2016
 Dublin Under 21 Hurling Championship Winner
 1975 (as Eoghan Ruadhs), 1988 (as St. Oliver Plunkett's) 
 Dublin Under 21 B Hurling Championship Winner
 2018
 Dublin Minor A Hurling Championship Winners (14)
 1937 (as Eoghan Ruadhs), 1938 (as Eoghan Ruadhs), 1939 (as Eoghan Ruadhs), 1940 (as Eoghan Ruadhs), 1941 (as Eoghan Ruadhs), 1942 (as Eoghan Ruadhs), 1972, (as Eoghan Ruadhs), 1973 (as Eoghan Ruadhs), 1974 (as Eoghan Ruadhs), 1977 (as Eoghan Ruadhs), 1980(as St. Oliver Plunkett's), 1984 (as St. Oliver Plunkett's), 1986 (as St. Oliver Plunkett's), 1987 (as St. Oliver Plunkett's)
 Dublin Minor B Hurling Championship Winners
 2013, 2017

Camogie
Eoghan Ruadh camogie club were All-Ireland Senior Club Camogie Champions in 1967 in 1967. The club was founded in 1937 by Muriel Munnelly, Annie Hogan, Elsie Hickey and the O’Briens in Aughrim Street Parish, Dublin.  The club was promoted to the senior grade in 1939 and has remained in the top level since. They won their first Dublin senior championship in 1953 and a three-in-a-row from 1967 to 1969. 
Two presidents of the Camogie Association, Pat Rafferty and Phyllis Breslin, and Dublin chairperson, Anne Ashton, played on the winning 1967 team.

Notable players
 Alan Brogan, former senior inter-county footballer for Dublin
 Bernard Brogan, current senior inter-county footballer for Dublin
 Paul Brogan, former senior inter-county footballer for Dublin
 Mick Galvin, former senior inter-county footballer for Dublin
 Declan Lally, former senior inter-county footballer for Dublin
 Ross McConnell, former senior inter-county footballer for Dublin
 Ciarán McKeever, current senior inter-county footballer for Armagh
 Anthony Moyles, former senior inter-county footballer for Meath
 Jason Sherlock, former senior inter-county footballer for Dublin
 Gareth Smith, former senior inter-county footballer for Cavan

References

External links
 Official GAA Club Website
 Dublin Club GAA
 

Gaelic games clubs in Fingal
Gaelic football clubs in Fingal
Hurling clubs in Fingal